Aleksandr Lavrinenko (born June 6, 1961) is a Ukrainian sport shooter. He competed at the Summer Olympics in 1988 and 1992. In 1988, he tied for 25th place in the mixed trap event, and in 1992, he tied for 16th place in the mixed trap event.

References

1961 births
Living people
Trap and double trap shooters
Ukrainian male sport shooters
Shooters at the 1988 Summer Olympics
Shooters at the 1992 Summer Olympics
Olympic shooters of the Soviet Union
Olympic shooters of the Unified Team
Soviet male sport shooters